Galechirus is an extinct genus of anomodont therapsids. It was about 30 cm (1 ft) long.

Description 
Galechirus was lizard-like in appearance. It is considered to be a dicynodont by some paleontologists; others think Galechirus is a younger form of a larger therapsid. Judging from its teeth, it was an insectivore.

See also 

 List of therapsids

References 

Anomodont genera
Lopingian genus first appearances
Lopingian genus extinctions
Lopingian synapsids of Africa
Permian South Africa
Fossils of South Africa
Fossil taxa described in 1907
Taxa named by Robert Broom